David Wagner (born 1965) is a Canadian mathematics educator and full professor at the University of New Brunswick, Fredericton, Canada. He is an adjunct professor (professor II) at the University of South-Eastern Norway.

Service and functions 
He is co-editor-in-chief of Educational Studies in Mathematics. Previously, he was associate editor of Educational Studies in Mathematics since 2016. He was managing editor of For the Learning of Mathematics from 2011 to 2018.

His main area of expertise is mathematics education.

References

External links
Home page
Google scholar profile

1965 births
Living people
Academic staff of the University of New Brunswick
Academic journal editors
Educational Studies in Mathematics editors